Dadash Babazhanov (1 March 1922  6 February 1985) was a Uyghur machine gunner in the 1369th Rifle Regiment of the Red Army during World War II who was awarded the title Hero of the Soviet Union in 1945.

References 

1922 births
1985 deaths
Uyghur people
Heroes of the Soviet Union
Recipients of the Order of Glory
Soviet military personnel of World War II